Part XIX of the Constitution of India is a compilation of laws pertaining to the constitution of India as a country and the union of states that it is made of.  This part of the constitution consists of Miscellaneous

Article 361 is an exception to Article 14 (Right to Equality) of the Indian Constitution. The features are as follows:
1. The President or the Governor is not answerable to any court for the exercise of the powers and duties of his office.
2. No criminal proceedings shall be conducted against the President or the Governor during his term of office.
3. No arrest or imprisonment shall be made against the President or Governor during his term of office.
4. Civil proceedings in which relief is claimed against the President or the Governor shall be instituted during his term of office in any court in respect of any act done or purporting to be done by him in his personal capacity, whether before or after he entered his office as President or Governor until the expiration of two months next after notice is given to him in writing.

The President & Governor are the sole guardians of the  country and states respectively so the absence of their rule will affect the country or the states.

References

Sources

Part XIX text from wikisource

Part 19